The Alcide was a 74-gun Pégase class ship of the line of the French Navy, launched in 1782.

In 1782, she took part in the American war of Independence in De Grasse's fleet.

She took part in the Battle of Hyères, under captain Le Blond Saint-Hilaire. She was the last ship of the French rear when she was becalmed and had to fight HMS Victory, Culloden, and Cumberland. She managed to damage the rigging of Culloden, but was quickly battered by her overwhelmingly superior opponents. She surrendered to Cumberland at 2h. The frigates  Justice and Alceste attempted to take her in tow to safety, but were repelled by gunfire from Victory.

Soon thereafter, a fire broke out, reportedly in her tops or by her own Heated shots. She exploded 30 minutes afterwards with the loss of 300.

References

 Dictionnaire des bâtiments de la flotte française, Jean-Michel Roche 
 Winfield, Rif and Roberts, Stephen (2015) French Warships in the Age of Sail 1786-1861: Design, Construction, Careers and Fates. Seaforth Publishing. .

Ships of the line of the French Navy
1782 ships
Ships built in France
Maritime incidents in 1795
Pégase-class ships of the line
Shipwrecks in the Mediterranean Sea